The 2000 U.S. Senate election in California was held on November 7, 2000. Incumbent Democratic U.S. Senator Dianne Feinstein won re-election to her second full term.

Democratic primary

Candidates
Dianne Feinstein, incumbent Senator since 1992
Michael Schmier, Emeryville attorney and candidate for California Attorney General in 1998

Results

Republican primary

Candidates
John M. Brown
Tom Campbell, U.S. Representative from Campbell
Linh Dao
James Peter Gough
Bill Horn, San Diego County Supervisor
Ray Haynes, State Senator from Murrieta

Results

Other nominations

Green

Reform

Libertarian

American Independent

Natural Law

General election

Campaign
Despite touting his service as a moderate Republican representing a strongly Democratic district, Campbell was underfunded and a decided underdog against the popular, heavily financed Feinstein. By February, he spent barely $1 million without any PAC money. Campbell has generally supported gay rights and abortion. He also opposes the War on Drugs and calls himself a "maverick", similar to U.S. Senator John McCain. Campbell was easily defeated, losing by over 19 points.

Debates
Complete video of debate, October 24, 2000
Complete video of debate, October 27, 2000

Results

Results breakdown
Final results from the Secretary of State of California.

Green Party candidate Medea Susan Benjamin finished second (ahead of Republican Tom Campbell) in six Northern California municipalities, most of which are in the San Francisco Bay Area: Oakland (10.18%), Emeryville (13.35%), Albany (14.37%), Fairfax (15.99%), Berkeley (22.23%), and Arcata (26.77%). She tied with Jones for second place in Point Arena with 21.71% of the vote.

See also
United States Senate elections, 2000

References

External links
 JoinCalifornia 2000 General Election

2000
California
2000 California elections